Jalan Kangkar Tebrau (Johor state route J101) is a major road in Johor Bahru, Johor, Malaysia. It is also a main route to Taman Daya.

List of junctions

Kampung Ubi–Seri Purnama side

Kangkar Tebrau–Pandan side

Roads in Johor